Earthbound is the twelfth album by American pop group the 5th Dimension, released in 1975 by ABC Records. It is the last album for the group's original line-up of Billy Davis Jr., Marilyn McCoo, Florence LaRue, Lamonte McLemore and Ron Townson. After touring with the 5th Dimension in support of this album, Billy Davis Jr. and Marilyn McCoo (being married since 1969) left the group to work as a duo and as solo artists.

In contrast to most of their previous albums, Earthbound features synthesizers prominently in many of its tracks—particularly "Magic In My Life" and "Moonlight Mile".  "Magic in My Life", the second and final single released from the album (after "Walk Your Feet in the Sunshine"), was also unusual in that it was the first 5th Dimension single to feature Florence LaRue on the lead. She would frequently be the lead on successive 5th Dimension singles with various line-ups.

Perhaps owing to its singular status as an ABC Records release, for decades the album remained the only one recorded by the original 5th Dimension line-up to not be issued on CD. It finally was released on CD in June 2014, through Real Gone Music.

Track listing
All songs were written by Jimmy Webb, except where indicated.

"Prologue" (Jimmy Webb) / "Be Here Now" (George Harrison) – 4:05
"Don't Stop For Nothing" (James C. Johnson) – 2:43
"I've Got a Feeling" (John Lennon, Paul McCartney) – 4:23
"Magic in My Life" (James C. Johnson) – 3:17
"Walk Your Feet in the Sunshine" – 4:13
"When Did I Lose Your Love" – 2:47
"Lean On Me Always" – 4:28
"Speaking With My Heart" – 3:40
"Moonlight Mile" (Mick Jagger, Keith Richards) – 5:15
"Epilogue" – 2:37

Personnel
Music
 Billy Davis Jr. – baritone vocals
 Florence LaRue – alto vocals
 Marilyn McCoo – soprano vocals
 Lamonte McLemore – bass vocals
 Ron Townson – tenor vocals
 Harvey Mason – drums
 Jeff Porcaro – drums ("Moonlight Mile")
 Harvey Mason – percussion
 Fred Tackett – guitar
 Jesse Ed Davis – guitar
 Dennis Budimir – guitar
 Dan Ferguson – guitar
 Paul Stallworth – bass
 Bill Como – ARP synthesizer
 John Myles – keyboards
 David Paich – keyboards ("Magic In My Life")
 Michael Lawrence – brass
 David Duke – French horn
 Vincent DeRosa – French horn
 Sid Sharp – strings
 John Myles – vocal arrangements and special vocal backgrounds
 Larry Coryell – acoustic guitar solos

Production
 Jimmy Webb – producer and arranger
 John Haeny – engineer (basic tracks)
 Alan O'Duffy – engineer (vocals, strings, and mixing)
 Carole Rubinstein – cover painting
 Sunset Sound and Village Recorders – recording
 Wally Heider – mixing
 ABC Recording Studios Inc. - mastering

Charts

Album
Billboard (North America)

Singles
Billboard (North America)

References

The 5th Dimension albums
1975 albums
Albums arranged by Jimmy Webb
Albums produced by Jimmy Webb
ABC Records albums